Cool Air is a 1999 black-and-white horror film directed by and starring Bryan Moore, and co-starring Jack Donner, with cinematography by Michael Bratkowski. It is based on the short story "Cool Air" by H. P. Lovecraft. This film is the start of a multi-volume series called The H.P. Lovecraft Collection. The series is supposed to feature the best of the films submitted at the H.P. Lovecraft Film Festival.

Plot
In the 1920s, impoverished horror writer Randolph Carter rents a room from Mrs. Caprezzi, an elderly landlady. Not long after settling into the shabby and almost bare room, he discovers a pool of ammonia on the floor that has leaked down from the room above. Mrs. Caprezzi, while cleaning up the ammonia, regales Randolph with strange stories of Dr. Muñoz (Jack Donner), the eccentric old gentleman who lives in the room upstairs. Later, Randolph suffers a heart attack and painfully makes his way to the doctor's room where he is treated with an unconventional medicine and makes a remarkable recovery. Befriending the doctor, Carter soon discovers the awful truth about the doctor's condition, why his room is kept intensely cold, and the fragile line that separates life and death.

Cast
Bryan Moore as Randolph Carter 
Jack Donner as Doctor Muñoz 
Vera Lockwood as Mrs. Caprezzi 
Dukey Flyswatter as Street Bum 
Ron Ford as Repairman

Production
Cool Air was filmed on location in Glendale, California, USA over several weekends, using a CP-16R regular 16mm camera package owned by DP Michael Bratkowski. The film was shot on Ilford Black and White regular 16mm film stock.

References

External links
Lurker Films (distributor)

1999 films
Films based on works by H. P. Lovecraft
American science fiction horror films
American black-and-white films
1999 horror films
1990s English-language films
Films based on short fiction
Films set in California
1990s science fiction horror films
Films shot in 16 mm film
1990s American films